Adam Fielding is a UK-based electronic music producer and composer.

History
Starting in 1995, Fielding began writing music using a combination of an Atari STe computer running Protracker software. Although this started out as more of a hobby to support his interest in games programming, his interest in music led him to start experimenting further with tracker music in 1997/98. His developing interest in music led to him studying a BSc in music production at the University of Huddersfield in 2005. While studying at university, he began to incorporate more live instrumentation into his music. In 2008 he released his debut LP (Distant Activity) independently.

Following this independent release, Fielding released a free online single in 2009 (From Out Of Nowhere), followed by another single in 2010 (Lost In Silence) through the social network record label solarSwarm.

Fielding released a second album in 2010 (Lightfields). Following the release of Lightfields, both Distant Activity and Lightfields were signed to and re-distributed through Distinctive Records. In 2012 he released an album of selected ambient works (And All Is As It Should Be) through Lost Language Recordings, featuring original tracks and re-workings of existing material in a more cinematic style. This was followed by an album of instrumental tracks written for film, TV, and games (Chase The Light), which was released in 2012 through FiXT.

Fielding re-united with Distinctive Records in 2013 to release the full-length album Icarus, which was preceded by a single of the same name featuring The City of Prague Philharmonic Orchestra.

Discography
The Dawn EP - 2008
Distant Activity - 2008
From Out of Nowhere - 2009
Lost In Silence - 2010
Lightfields - 2010
Chase The Light - 2012
And All Is As It Should Be - 2012
Icarus - 2013
Pieces - 2014
AdFi (as AdFi) - 2014
Obscurer - 2015
The Broken Divide - 2016
Mesmera - 2018

Notes and references

External links
Official website
Facebook
Distinctive Records
Bandcamp page
Soundcloud
Magnatune page, alt to bandcamp for getting his albums

Year of birth missing (living people)
Living people
British electronic musicians
Place of birth missing (living people)
Tracker musicians